Kutzenhausen may refer to:

Kutzenhausen, Bas-Rhin
Kutzenhausen, Germany